Mohammad Saba'aneh (born in Jenin district in 1978) is a Palestinian painter and caricaturist from Jenin district. He has been an active member in the Cartoon Movement since August 24, 2009. Saba'aneh is a cartoonist for Al-Hayat al-Jadida, the official newspaper of the Palestinian Authority and also works at the Arab American University in Jenin on the West Bank.

See also
 Palestinian art

References 

1978 births
Palestinian painters
Palestinian caricaturists
Living people
Palestinian artists
Palestinian cartoonists
Academic staff of An-Najah National University